Between Maybes is a 2019 Philippine romance drama directed by Jason Paul Laxamana starring Gerald Anderson and Julia Barretto. The film was produced by Black Sheep Productions and is distributed by Star Cinema.

Plot
Hazel (Barretto) is an actress and commercial model who has a controlling relationship with her parents. One night, after having a heated argument with her parents, she decides to take a vacation and books a flight to Japan. Louie (Anderson), a Filipino who lives in Japan and works as a waiter in a local seafood restaurant, meets Hazel.

Cast

Main Cast
Gerald Anderson as Louie Puyat
Julia Barretto as Hazel Ilagan

Supporting Cast
Yayo Aguila
Christian Vasquez

References

2019 films